Dudek in Iran, also rendered as Dodak, may refer to:
 Dudek-e Olya
 Dudek-e Sofla
 Dudek-e Vosta